The Forty-Nine Legislature of the Chamber of Representatives of Uruguay is the current meeting of the lower house of the Uruguayan General Assembly. It convened in Montevideo, on February 15, 2020, and will end on February 15, 2025, during the Presidency of Luis Alberto Lacalle Pou. Deputies were elected in the 2019 general election in nineteen constituencies.

Political parties

Members 
Source:

Artigas 

 Nicolás Lorenzo (FA)
 Valentina Dos Santos (PN)

Canelones 

 Alfonso Lereté (PN)
 Álvaro Dastugue (PN)
 Álvaro Perrone (CA)
 Carlos Testa (CA)
 Javier Radiccioni (PN)
 Jorge Alvear (PC)
 José Carlos Mahía (FA)
 Lucía Etcheverrý (FA)
 Nelson Larzábal (FA)
 Orquídea Minneti (FA)
 Pedro Irigoin (FA)
 Sebastián Andújar (PN)
 Sebastián Sabini (FA)
 Ubaldo Aita (FA)
 Walter Cervini (PC)

Cerro Largo 

 Alfredo Fratti (FA)
 Christian Morel (PN)
 Wilman Caballero (CA)

Colonia 

 Nibia Reisch (PN)
 Nicolás Viera (FA)
 Mario Enrique Colman (PN)

Durazno 

 Benjamín Irazábal (PN)
 Martín Tierno (FA)

Flores 

 Juan Federico Ruiz (FA)
 Laura Burgoa (PN)

Florida 

 Carlos Enciso (PN)
 Carlos Rodríguez (FA)

Lavalleja 

 Javier Umpiérrez (FA)
 Mario García (PN)

Maldonado 

 Diego Echeverría (PN)
 Eduardo Antonini (FA)
 Eduardo Elinger (PC)
 Rodrigo Blas (PN)
 Sebastián Cal (CA)

Montevideo 

 Alejandro Sánchez (FA)
 Álvaro Viviano (PN)
 Ana Olivera (FA)
 Andrés Abt (PN)
 Bettiana Díaz (FA)
 Carlos Varela (FA)
 Cecilia Cairo (FA)
 César Vega (PERI)
 Claudia Hugo (FA)
 Conrado Rodríguez (PC)
 Cristina Lustemberg (FA)
 Daniel Caggiani (FA)
 Daniel Gerhard (FA)
 Daniel Peña (PC)
 Eduardo Lust (CA)
 Elsa Capillera (CA)
 Felipe Carballo (FA)
 Felipe Schipani (PC)
 Gabriel Gianoli (PN)
 Gabriel Otero (FA)
 Gabriela Barreiro (FA)
 Gonzalo Civila (FA)
 Gerardo Núnez (FA)
 Gonzalo Mujica (PN)
 Gustavo Olmos (FA)
 Gustavo Zubía (PC)
 Iván Posada (PI)
 Juan Martín Rodríguez (PN)
 Lilián Galán (FA)
 Martín Lema (PN)
 María Eugenia Rosello (PC)
 Martín Sodano (CA)
 Mariano Tucci (FA)
 Ope Pasquet (PC)
 Pedro Jisdonian (PN)
 Pablo Viana (PN)
 Rodrigo Goñi (PN)
 Silvana Pérez (CA)
 Susana Pereyra (FA)

Paysandú 

 Cecilia Bottino (FA)
 Juan Moreno (PC)
 Nicolás OIivera (PN)

Río Negro 

 Constante Mendiondo (FA) 
 Omar Lafluf (PN)

Rivera 

 Gerardo Amarilla (PN)
 Marne Osorio (PC)
 Nazmi Camargo (CA)

Rocha 

 Alejo Umpiérrez (PN)
 Gabriel Tinaglini (FA)

Salto 

 Álvaro Lima (FA) 
 Omar Estévez (PC)
 Rodrigo Albernaz (CA)

San José 

 Nicolás Mesa (FA) 
 Rubén Aníbal Bacigalupe (PN)

Soriano 

 Enzo Malán (FA) 
 Guillermo Besozzi (PN)
 Martín Melazzi (PC)

Tacuarembó 

 Alfredo De Mattos (PN)
 Rafael Menéndez (CA)
 Zulimar Ferreira (FA)

Treinta y Tres 

 Dardo Sánchez Cal (PN)
 Sergio Mier (FA)

References 

Government of Uruguay